Negro Pabellón (also called Pabellón or Pabellón de Santa Clara) is a peak in Mendoza, Argentina with an elevation of  metres. Negro Pabellón is within the Central Andes and is the highest at Cordón de las Delicias. Its territory is within the Argentinean protection area of Provincial Reserve for Multiple Use and Natural Recreation Manzano / Portillo de Piuquenes. Its slopes are within the administrative boundaries of the Argentinean city of Tunuyán.

First Ascent 
Negro was first climbed by Antonio Alméciga, Dante Bañón, Andres Garcia and Dante Maniero (Argentina) April 3, 1953.

Elevation 
It has an official height of 6157 meters. Other data from available digital elevation models: SRTM yields 6072 metres, SRTM2 6077 metres, ASTER 6033 metres and TanDEM-X 6106 metres.

The height of the nearest key col is 4999 meters, leading to a topographic prominence of 1091 meters. Negro Pabellón is considered a Mountain Massif according to the Dominance System and its dominance is 17.91%. Its parent peak is Tupungato and the Topographic isolation is 11.9 kilometers.

References

External links 

 Elevation information about Negro
 Weather Forecast at Negro

Mountains of Mendoza Province